The 2021 Asia Rugby Sevens Series was a rugby sevens tournament held in Dubai, United Arab Emirates in late November 2021. Following the cancellation of the 2020 series due to impacts of the COVID-19 pandemic, it was the twelfth edition of Asia's continental sevens circuit. The event acted as a qualifier for the 2022 World Rugby Sevens Challenger Series in Chile and the 2022 Rugby World Cup Sevens in South Africa. Hong Kong and South Korea qualified for both events. 

Incheon, Huizhou and Colombo were originally scheduled as legs of the 2021 series, but all were eventually cancelled due to impacts of the COVID-19 pandemic and replaced by two events in the United Arab Emirates. This was eventually changed again to a single sevens event held in Dubai.

Qualification

Five teams from West Asia played in a qualification tournament over two days to make up the eighth place at the Asia Rugby Sevens Series.  The event was played as a round-robin and knockout, hosted by Qatar. Previous attendees United Arab Emirates won the tournament on 9 October.

Teams
There were eight teams competing in the tournament, which only had one change from the previous one (2019):

Pool stage

Pool A

Pool B

Knockout stage

Plate playoffs

Semi-finals

Seventh place

Fifth place

Cup playoffs

Semi-finals

Third place

Final

Final standings

See also
 2021 Asia Rugby Women's Sevens Series

References

External links 
 2021 Asia Rugby Sevens Series
 Results (Archived)
 Table (Archived)
 Knockout (Archived)
 Statistics (Archived)

Asian Seven Series
2021 rugby sevens competitions
2021 in Asian rugby union
Asia Rugby Sevens
2021 in Emirati sport
International rugby union competitions hosted by the United Arab Emirates
Sports competitions in Dubai